Santa Fe Dam is a flood-control dam on the San Gabriel River located in Irwindale in Los Angeles County, California, United States. During the dry season, the basin behind the dam is used for groundwater recharge, as well as various recreational activities.

History
Construction of the dam began in 1941 under the U.S. Army Corps of Engineers (USACE), mainly in response to major floods on the river in 1938; however, work stopped in 1943 and did not resume again until 1946 due to the unlucky intervention of a major flood and World War II. The dam embankment and spillway were completed in early 1947, and the entire project was finished in January 1949 with the installation of the spillway gates, four months ahead of schedule.

Santa Fe Dam Recreational Area 
The Los Angeles County Board of Supervisors passed a resolution in 1955 stating that the county wished to develop recreation amenities in the basin, but funds committed elsewhere precluded recreation development at the basin until 1974. A Master Plan was prepared by the corps in 1975.  It described recreation amenities proposed to be cost shared equally between the corps and the county and to be maintained by the county. The majority of the existing recreation amenities in the basin were built between 1976 and 1984. The recreation amenities constructed during this time period were jointly developed by the corps and county on a cost shared basis. The original lease with the county was signed in May 1976 with a term of 50 years. In 1984 at the completion of the recreation amenities, the lease was amended to extend through December 2036.  A master plan update in 1995 reflected 1995 conditions and proposed additional recreation development.

During most of the year, the empty reservoir behind the Santa Fe Dam is used for recreational purposes. The Santa Fe Dam Recreation Area, located in Irwindale, is an  multi-use facility located behind the dam.

The park's main feature is a  lake with boat rentals, fishing, a swimming beach, hiking trails, cycling trails, and California native plants and chaparral habitat conservation areas.

Statistics

Water releases from the dam are controlled by two sets of gates. The outlet works, located at the base of the dam, are fed by sixteen  diameter conduits capable of discharging .

Operations
The dam functions as a dry dam, with its reservoir empty most of the year. During large floods, water is stored behind the dam and then released as quickly as possible without exceeding the capacity of downstream levees. By capacity, it is the second largest dam along the San Gabriel, after Whittier Narrows.

During the summer and autumn months, most of the water flowing into the Santa Fe reservoir is diverted into the Santa Fe Spreading Grounds, located near the upper end of the flood control basin, helping to recharge groundwater levels in the San Gabriel Valley. Excess inflow can be sent to the Peck Road Water Conservation Area and additional spreading grounds along the Rio Hondo. As a result, the San Gabriel River channel below the dam is often bone dry.

See also
List of reservoirs and dams in California

References

Dams in Los Angeles County, California
San Gabriel River (California)
Geography of the San Gabriel Valley
Dams completed in 1949
United States Army Corps of Engineers dams
Azusa, California
Irwindale, California